Joanne Gloria Rio (née Rotunno; December 15, 1931 – November 29, 1984) was an American actress.

Early life
She was born Joanne Gloria Rotunno in Chicago on December 15, 1931. She was the daughter of Eddie Rio, who in 1954 was the West Coast head of the American Guild of Variety Artists.

Career
Apart from acting in her own right, she also worked as a stand-in for Elizabeth Taylor.

Personal life
In 1954, she was engaged to Liberace, but her father stopped her marrying as he was concerned about rumours of his sexuality. In November 1954, Rio appeared on the front cover of TV Guide, alongside Liberace.

Selected filmography
Riding with Buffalo Bill (1954) as María Pérez
Seminole Uprising (1955)

Selected television
The Joey Bishop Show (1961)

References

External links

1931 births
1984 deaths
American film actresses
Actresses from Chicago
20th-century American actresses